Korlai Fort is a colonial fort in the Raigad district of Maharashtra, India. Formerly a part of the Chaul in Portuguese India, the structure is a specimen of Portuguese colonial architecture. It was built as a companion to the fort at Chaul, at this strategic position the Portuguese could use it to defend their province which stretched from Korlai to the Fort Bassein. Vestiges of the Portuguese occupation are manifested in the distinct dialect of the Korlai villages inhabitants which is a Luso-Indian creole called Korlai Portuguese Creole.

History 

This fort was built in 1521 by the Portuguese with the permission of the Ahmednagar sultanate. In 1521, taking advantage of the confusion in the aftermath of the death of the Burhan Nizam the Portuguese tried to take over the fort. However the sultan retaliated and sent some of his best men to reclaim the fort. Subsequently, a truce was reached in which the Ahmednagar sultanate occupied the island and no further fortification of the island took place. Only a wooden cross remained on the island as a sign of its former rulers.

However, in 1594, Abranches, a Portuguese captain with 1,500 soldiers and 1,500 natives took possession of the fort. The besieged soldiers of the Sultanate tried to block their way by putting a dead elephant at the main gate and a dead horse at the inner gate. But in the end they had to surrender. The Portuguese won the fort but not having enough men to stand guard there chose to destroy it leaving only the central tower and a battery intact.

Before its destruction, Korlai had been described by travelers as a "magnificent fortress as strong as any other in the world". On the inland side - the only place where it was susceptible to be attacked it was protected by a ditch and could only be accessed by a drawbridge. The main entrance was guarded by a bronze lion and the highest tower by a bronze eagle. It housed 7,000 horses and as much men.

Some parts of it were rebuilt later but now had a garrison of only 50 men. The church within the fort was used for worship on Sundays and holidays. Korlai fort was also strategically very important as it guarded the mouth of the bay. Chhatrapati Sambhaji Maharaj the son of Chhatrapati Shivaji Maharaj tried to take it over but failed and had to withdraw his forces on 6 December 1687. The fort was taken by the Marathas who held it from 1739-1818.

Major features 

The fort is 2828 feet long, and its average breadth is eighty-nine feet. The enclosing wall is 5' 3" high and has 305 battlements for guns. It is entered by eleven gates - four are outer and seven are inner. At the north point, within pistol-shot of main battery is the water cistern named Santa Cruz - major source of water. The area within the fort walls is divided into three enclosures by two lines of bastioned fortifications. Each of the seven bastions bears the name of a saint. The two westward bastions are named São Diego(after Didacus of Alcalá) and São Francisco (after Francis of Assisi). The others are São Pedro, São Inácio, and São Filipe.

The top of the hill is bastioned as well and is surrounded by a parapet. It has a large rainwater cistern with three mouths, each one foot wide, and the ruins of the magazine and a church. The church was built in 1630 for the use of the army and was functional until 1728.

There are three Portuguese inscriptions. One, over a doorway in the centre and highest part of the fort (see picture), reads as follows:

This castle was commanded to be built by the Viceroy of India Dom Filipe Mascarenhas in November of the year 1646 and Fernão Miranda Henriques being Captain of Chaul, and was finished in May 1680, Cristóvão de Abreu de Azevedo being Captain of this fort.

The inscription is surmounted by a cross with a coat of arms having the Portuguese stars in the centre and surrounded by seven castles. Other inscriptions over the main entrance and over an altar in the chapel are worn out and undecipherable. During the brief Maratha rule, some of the names of the bastions were changed but now the only indication of their presence is some dismantled shrines.

Forest
The hill slopes surrounding the fort are in control of the MaharashtraForest department. Originally trees of teak were planted on the eastern slopes later in 1996 plantation of Casuarina, cashew and Acacia auriculiformis was done to check erosion.

How to reach
It is easily approachable by road. The road from Korlai bus stop ends at the Lighthouse. The fort has three entrance. The entrance from western side is the easiest way, it is from the Lighthouse side. Climbing few steps one reaches in the middle of the fort. The entrance from the eastern side is a tedious walk of 20 minutes. This route is the main route and the entrance is through main gate, but this route is not recommended in rainy season as this is less used route. The entrance from the port side or northern side is good one. One can reach there by walking along a path from the light house.There is ample of water on the topmost fortification, so a night halt can easily be made.

Rail
The nearest railway station is at Roha which is 42 km from the fort.

Road
Korlai is around 117 Km south of Mumbai via State Highway 104 and 24 km from Alibag via State Highway 91.

Gallery

Where To Stay 
Less than 30 minutes from Korlai Fort are private 2-bedroom beach villas. Adorned in hues reminiscent of Goan and Portuguese architecture, these private villas are perched on a secluded stretch of Korlai beach with no permanent habitation for half a kilometer on either side. With nothing but the moonlight to keep company, it is the perfect spot for tourists to unwind and reconnect. The best and cheapest way to enjoy the real taste of sea-fort is staying in the abandoned church on the fort. The trekkers should carry a sleeping bag, torch, and drinking water for a night stay. The nearest Village is Chaul & Revdanda having all types of hotels, Homestays. recommended hotels as Fern Sylvanus resort, Awesome Cottages, Gokul cottage, Vasundhara Cottage & many more.

References

See also 
 Chaul
 List of forts in Maharashtra
 Portuguese India
List of topics on the Portuguese East Indies

Forts in Raigad district
Portuguese forts in India
16th-century forts in India
1521 in India
1520s in Portuguese India
1594 in India
1590s in Portuguese India
1520s establishments in Portuguese India
1521 establishments in the Portuguese Empire